Karl-Heinz Bendert (9 September 1914 – 16 July 1983) was a German Luftwaffe ace and recipient of the Knight's Cross of the Iron Cross during World War II.  Karl-Heinz Bendert claimed 55 victories in 610 missions.  During his time with JG 27 in Africa he was involved in scandal with falsifying claims; his victories were mostly false because he would claim to have shot down enemy aircraft during missions in which other squadron members did shoot down aircraft to save face. Despite this, he was given credit to the victories. After a confrontation with his squadron leader, Gustav Roedel, who did not interfere with his Knight's Cross of the Iron Cross nomination, he did not score any more victories.

Awards
 Ehrenpokal der Luftwaffe (18 September 1942)
 Front Flying Clasp of the Luftwaffe
 Iron Cross (1939)
 2nd Class
 1st Class
 German Cross in Gold on 15 October 1942 as Oberfeldwebel in the 4./Jagdgeschwader 27
 Knight's Cross of the Iron Cross on 30 December 1942 as Oberfeldwebel and pilot in the 5./Jagdgeschwader 27

Notes

References

Citations

Bibliography

External links
TracesOfWar.com
Aces of the Luftwaffe
Ritterkreuztrager 1939-1945

1914 births
1983 deaths
Luftwaffe pilots
German World War II flying aces
Recipients of the Gold German Cross
Recipients of the Knight's Cross of the Iron Cross
People from Świebodzin
People from the Province of Brandenburg